The board foot or board-foot is a unit of measurement for the volume of lumber in the United States and Canada.

Board foot can be abbreviated as FBM (for "foot, board measure"), BDFT, or BF. A thousand board feet can be abbreviated as MFBM, MBFT, or MBF. Similarly, a million board feet can be abbreviated as MMFBM, MMBFT, or MMBF.

Until 1970s in Australia and New Zealand the terms super foot and superficial foot were used with the same meaning.

One board foot equals:
 1 ft × 1 ft × 1 in
 12 in × 12 in × 1 in
 144 in3
 1/12 ft3
 ≈ 
 ≈ 
 ≈  or steres 
 1/1980 Petrograd Standard of board

The board foot is used to measure rough lumber (before drying and planing with no adjustments) or planed/surfaced lumber. An example of planed lumber is softwood 2 × 4 lumber sold by large lumber retailers. The 2 × 4 is actually only , but the dimensions for the lumber when purchased wholesale could still be represented as full 2 × 4 lumber, although the "standard" can vary between vendors. This means that nominal lumber includes air space around the physical board when calculating board feet in some situations, while the true measurement of "board feet" should be limited to the actual dimensions of the board.

For planed lumber, board feet refer to the nominal thickness and width of lumber, calculated in principle on its size before drying and planing. Here the actual length is used.

See dimensional lumber for a full discussion of the relationship of actual and nominal dimensions. Briefly, for softwoods, to convert nominal to actual, subtract  for dimensions under 2 inches; subtract  for dimensions over 2 inches and under 8 inches; and subtract  for larger measurements. The system is more complicated for hardwoods.

See also 

 Canadian units
 Cord
 Cubic ton
 Forest product
 Hoppus foot
 List of unusual units of measurement
 Measurement Canada
 Measurement Information Division of Industry Canada
 Petrograd Standard
 Standard (unit)
 Stere
 United States customary units
 Units of measurement
 Weights and Measures Act

References

Units of volume
Customary units of measurement in the United States
Logging
Wood